Burbage  may refer to:

People 
 Burbage (surname)

Places in England 
 Burbage Brook, river in Derbyshire and Sheffield
 Burbage, Derbyshire
 Burbage, Leicestershire
 Burbage, Wiltshire
 Burbage Primary School, London Borough of Hackney

See also